Lachute Airport  is a general aviation airport  southwest of Lachute, northwest of Montreal, Quebec, Canada.

The airport is classified as an airport of entry by Nav Canada and is staffed by the Canada Border Services Agency (CBSA). CBSA officers at this airport can handle general aviation aircraft only, with no more than 15 passengers.

See also

 List of airports in the Montreal area

References

External links
 Lachute Aviation

Lachute
Registered aerodromes in Laurentides